Brett Page (born 5 September 1966) is a former Australian rules footballer who played with the Sydney Swans in the Australian Football League (AFL).

Page, from East Wagga, played his only senior AFL game in the 11th round of the 1990 season, against Hawthorn at Princes Park. He had four disposals and kicked a behind.

References

1966 births
Australian rules footballers from New South Wales
Sydney Swans players
Living people